Sławno  (Kashubian/Pomeranian: Słôwno) is a town on the Wieprza river in Middle Pomerania region, north-western Poland, with 12,511 inhabitants (2019). It is the administrative seat of Gmina Sławno, though not part of it. The town is also the capital of Sławno County in West Pomeranian Voivodeship  since 1999, previously in Słupsk Voivodeship (1975–1998).

Sławno is a railway junction on the major Gdańsk–Szczecin line, with access to secondary importance connections to Darłowo and Korzybie. It is also a stop on the European route E28 running parallel to the south coast of the Baltic Sea between the cities of Koszalin and Słupsk.

History

Since the mid-12th century the Land of Słupsk-Sławno was under the rule of Duke Ratibor I of Pomerania and his descendants, a cadet branch of the Griffin dynasty. From 1190 to 1238 it was the capital of the Duchy of Pomerania-Schlawe. When the line became extinct about 1227, their estates were the matter of an inheritance conflict between the Griffin Duke Barnim I the Good and Swietopelk II from the Samborid dynasty, who ruled over the adjacent territories of Pomerelia (Gdańsk Pomerania) in the east. Both duchies had previously separated from Poland as a result of the 12th-century fragmentation of Poland (Pomerania in the 12th century, and Pomerelia in the 13th century).

Swietopelk II prevailed, his son Mestwin II, duke in Pomerelia from 1266, however again had to deal with claims raised by the Pomeranian Griffins and also by his brother Wratislaw II. To secure his rule, Mestwin accepted the suzerainty of the Ascanian margraves of Brandenburg by the 1269 Treaty of Arnswalde, but later on, in 1282, Mestwin and Polish Duke Przemysł II signed the Treaty of Kępno, which transferred the suzerainty over Gdańsk Pomerania including Sławno to Przemysł II. Upon Mestwin's death in 1294, the Samborides became extinct and Sławno was reintegrated with Poland. In 1308 Brandenburg invaded the region and Waldemar of Ascania finally separated Sławno from Pomerelia, which he sold to the Teutonic Order by the 1309 Treaty of Soldin. He nevertheless lost the town to the Griffin duke Wartislaw IV of Pomerania in 1317, whereafter Sławno remained a part of the Griffin-ruled Pomeranian duchies until 1637.

Duke Wartislaw IV enfeoffed Peter von Neuenburg of the Swienca noble family with Sławno, who granted the settlement city rights in 1317. The Gothic St Mary's Church was consecrated about 1360. Between 1368 and 1478 Sławno was under the rule of dukes of Słupsk, vassals of the Kingdom of Poland. Later on it was part of the Duchy of Pomerania, until its partition in the 17th century between Sweden and Brandenburg-Prussia. Devastated throughout the Thirty Years' War, the town was allotted to the Brandenburg Province of Pomerania by the 1653 Treaty of Stettin. Sławno suffered heavy destruction during the Second World War and its entire German population was expelled in 1945 and it was handed over to Poland.

Population

 1791: 1,682 inhabitants
 1852: 4,382 inhabitants
 1875: 5,141 inhabitants
 1910: 6,620 inhabitants
 1939: 9,746 inhabitants
 1947: 4,800 inhabitants (estimated)
 1960: 8,600 inhabitants
 1970: 10,800 inhabitants
 1975: 11,500 inhabitants
 1980: 12,700 inhabitants
 2002: 15,000 inhabitants
 2019: 12,511 inhabitants

Notable people
 Franz Mehring (1846–1919), German journalist, Communist and a Revolutionary Socialist 
 Hans-Martin Majewski (1911–1997), German composer of film scores
 Erica Wallach (1923–1994), American-German political activist and teacher
 Arwed Imiela (1929–1982), German serial killer
 Eberhard Mellies (1929-2019), German actor
 Otto Mellies (1931-2020), German actor
 Wolfgang Weber (born 1944), German footballer
 Marcin Wasilewski (born 1975), Polish pianist and composer
 Agnieszka Włodarczyk (born 1980), Polish actress and singer

Twin towns – sister cities

Sławno is twinned with:

 Cles, Italy
 Ribnitz-Damgarten, Germany
 Rinteln, Germany
 Ząbkowice Śląskie, Poland

Sławno is also a partner city with:

 Trento, Italy

References

External links
Official website

Cities and towns in West Pomeranian Voivodeship
Sławno County